Mark Nicholson (6 March 1871 – 3 July 1941) was an English footballer who played in the Football League for West Bromwich Albion. He was instrumental in establishing organised football in Austria.

Career 
 1889–1891: Oswestry Town (player)
 1891–1894: West Bromwich Albion (player)
 1894–1897: Luton Town (player)
 1897–1900: First Vienna FC (player, later player-coach)

Honours 
West Bromwich Albion
 FA Cup: 1891–92

Vienna (player-coach)
 Challenge Cup: 1898–99, 1899–1900

References

1871 births
1941 deaths
English footballers
Association football defenders
English Football League players
Oswestry Town F.C. players
West Bromwich Albion F.C. players
Luton Town F.C. players
First Vienna FC players
First Vienna FC managers
English football managers
FA Cup Final players